Minister of Budget may refer to:
 Minister of Budget (Belgium)
 Minister of Budget (Italy)
 Minister for the Budget (Sweden)